Spin Out is a 1986 video game published by Interstel Corporation.

Gameplay
Spin Out is a game in which the drivers compete to finish with the best time in the race.

Reception
Rick Teverbaugh reviewed the game for Computer Gaming World, and stated that "overall, I like Spin Out for a enjoyable bare bones approach to auto racing."

References

1986 video games